Donald Wallace Munro (8 April 1916 – 28 July 1998) was a Progressive Conservative party member of the House of Commons of Canada. He was born in Regina, Saskatchewan and became a diplomat by career.

He represented British Columbia's Esquimalt—Saanich electoral district at which he won election in 1972. He was re-elected in the 1974, 1979 and 1980 federal elections. Munro left national politics in 1984 after serving in the 29th to 32nd Canadian Parliaments and did not campaign in any further federal elections.

External links
 
  Tribute to Donald Munro.
Memory BC:  Fonds AR309 - Donald W. Munro fonds
Donald Wallace Munro fonds, Library and Archives Canada

1916 births
1998 deaths
Canadian diplomats
Members of the House of Commons of Canada from British Columbia
Politicians from Regina, Saskatchewan
Progressive Conservative Party of Canada MPs